Yogesh Kathuniya (born 3 March 1997) is an Indian Paralympic athlete who specializes in the discus throw. He represented India at 2020 Summer Paralympics, where he won silver medal in men's discus throw F56 event. He has rare neurological disorder, Guillain-Barre syndrome, and consequent quadriparesis left him reliant on a wheelchair in 2006. After his mother learnt to give him physiotherapy, he started to walk, went to Tokyo and won the silver medal at the Tokyo paralympics 2020 in Japan .

Early life 

He was born to housewife Meena Devi and her husband Gyanchand Kathuniya - a soldier with the Indian Army. At the age of 9, Yogesh developed Guillain-Barre syndrome. He studied at Indian Army Public School in Chandigarh where his father served in army at Chandimandir Cantonment. His mother learnt physiotherapy, and within 3 years, at the age of 12 he regained muscle strength to walk again. He later studied Bachelor of Commerce degree from Kirori Mal College in Delhi where he joined para games.

Career

In 2016, Yogesh Kathunia started in para sports after Sachin Yadav, General Secretary of the students' union at Kirori Mal College https://kmc.du.ac.in/ , motivated him to take up sports by regularly showing him videos of para athletes.

In 2018, he set a world record in F36 category by throwing the disc to 45.18 m at 2018 World Para Athletics European Championships in Berlin.

In 2021 August, Kathuniya represented India in the men's discus throw F56 event at the 2020 Summer Paralympics and won a silver medal. In 2021 November, The honorable President Of India Ram Nath Kovind awarded Yogesh Kathuniya by Arjuna Award for his silver medal in 2020 Summer Paralympics.

See also
 India at the Paralympics

References

External links
 

1997 births
Living people
People from Delhi
Indian male discus throwers
Medalists at the World Para Athletics Championships
Paralympic athletes of India
Paralympic silver medalists for India
Paralympic medalists in athletics (track and field)
Athletes (track and field) at the 2020 Summer Paralympics
Medalists at the 2020 Summer Paralympics
Recipients of the Arjuna Award